Emma Ann Hardy (born 17 July 1979) is a British Labour Party politician. She has been the Member of Parliament (MP) for Kingston upon Hull West and Hessle since the 2017 general election. Until May 2019, she was also a member of Hessle Town Council focusing on NHS and education. Hardy is a member of Labour's National Policy Forum and was an education union employee.

Early life and education
Emma Hardy was brought up in North Newbald, Humberside, a few miles from the Kingston upon Hull West and Hessle constituency she now represents in Parliament. She attended Wyke Sixth Form College to study her A-Levels before studying for an undergraduate degree in Politics at the University of Liverpool, graduating in 2001. She then completed a PGCE at the University of Leeds in 2004, and taught for over ten years at Willerby Carr Lane Primary School.

Hardy became politically active in 2011, after joining a campaign protesting against school cuts and meeting Alan Johnson, the then-MP for Kingston upon Hull West and Hessle. She left teaching in 2015 to become a full-time organiser for the National Union of Teachers, and served as Deputy General Secretary of the Socialist Educational Association before being elected to Parliament.

Parliamentary career
Hardy was selected as the Labour Party's prospective parliamentary candidate for Kingston upon Hull West and Hessle after the then-MP, Alan Johnson, announced his retirement just weeks before the general election in 2017. She was one of 256 women candidates put forward by the Labour Party at that election, and was elected on 9 June 2017, with a majority of 8,025.

Since her election, Hardy has sat on the House of Commons Education Select Committee. There, she has challenged the Government to ban informal exclusions, voiced support for the teaching of oracy (fluency in spoken communication), and promoted the benefits of a broad curriculum which includes the arts, music and sports. In September 2018, Hardy began to work closely with the women's health charity Endometriosis UK to push for "menstrual wellbeing" to be included as part of the sex and relationship education in schools. On 25 February 2019, the UK government announced that menstrual wellbeing would be included in the curriculum going forward.

Hardy is also the Vice Chair of the All Party Parliamentary Group on Mesh, and campaigned to suspend the use of vaginal surgical mesh in the NHS. In October 2018, the National Institute for Health and Care Excellence (NICE) declared that vaginal mesh surgery should only be used as a "last resort" to treat pelvic organ prolapse and urinary incontinence. According to Hardy's website this will spare thousands of women from the horrific side effects of vaginal mesh surgery that women have endured since 2003.

From 2017 to 2020, Hardy served as Parliamentary Private Secretary to current Labour leader Keir Starmer in his previous role as Shadow Secretary of State for Exiting the European Union.

Hardy has campaigned locally in her constituency to secure the funding for the A63 Castle Street development, prevent any further delays and ensure a bridge was built as soon as possible. Following delays to the project, building of the bridge started in October 2018, and was expected to be open in early 2021. Meanwhile, preparation for the A63 road development commenced in October 2020 with the exhumation of 19,000 bodies from the Trinity Burial Ground, and the deconstruction of the Earl de Gray public house. Hardy has also lobbied successfully to bring money to Hull for a new Children and Adolescent Mental Health Unit. The money was agreed by the Government in July 2018 and the project was finally completed in January 2020.

Hardy is a patron for Articulacy which strives to improve lives by inspiring all people regardless of age or abilities to become confident and articulate individuals.

In January 2020, Hardy was appointed to Labour's frontbench as a Shadow Education Minister, succeeding Gordon Marsden, who lost his seat in the 2019 general election.

Hardy nominated Keir Starmer in the 2020 Labour Party leadership election and Angela Rayner in the deputy leadership election.

In March 2021 Hardy resigned from her role as a Shadow Education Minister, being succeeded by Matt Western. She cited an increase in constituency work due to the COVID-19 pandemic for her reasoning.

Personal life
Hardy lives in Hessle with her partner James and two daughters.

References

External links

1979 births
Living people
Schoolteachers from Yorkshire
Labour Party (UK) MPs for English constituencies
UK MPs 2017–2019
UK MPs 2019–present
Female members of the Parliament of the United Kingdom for English constituencies
21st-century British women politicians
English trade unionists
Labour Party (UK) councillors
Councillors in the East Riding of Yorkshire
Alumni of the University of Liverpool
Alumni of the University of Leeds
21st-century English women
21st-century English people
Women councillors in England
English women trade unionists